Prideaux is a surname of Cornish origin derived from the place called Prideaux in the parish of Luxulyan.

It may refer to

Individuals
 Brandon Prideaux (born 1976), an American soccer defender
 Sir Edmund Prideaux, 1st Baronet of Netherton (1554–1628), English lawyer
 Sir Edmund Prideaux, 1st Baronet of Ford Abbey (died 1659), English lawyer and MP for Lyme Regis (1640–1659), solicitor-general and attorney-general
 Sir Edmund Prideaux, 2nd Baronet of Ford Abbey (1632–1702), member of Parliament for Taunton (1680–1681), participant in Monmouth's Rebellion
 Edmund Prideaux (artist) (1693–1745), English architectural artist
 Humphrey Prideaux (1648–1724), Doctor of Divinity and scholar
 James Prideaux (1927–2015), American playwright
 John Prideaux (British Army officer) (1718–1759), British General during the French and Indian War
 John Prideaux (1578–1650), bishop of Worcester
 Sir Peter Prideaux, 3rd Baronet (1626–1705), MP for Honiton (1661–1679) and St Mawes (1685–1689)
 Roger Prideaux (born 1939), English cricketer
 Roger Prideaux (MP) (by 1524 – 1582), MP for Totnes (1545–1553)
 Sarah Prideaux (1853–1933), bookbinder and author
 Walter Prideaux (1806–1889), English poet and lawyer
 Walter Prideaux, banker and partner in Hingston & Prideaux
 Walter Prideaux (rower), 1910–1995), English rower

Families
 Prideaux baronets, family
The ancient gentry family of Prideaux was seated variously at Orcheton, Modbury; Adeston, Holbeton; Thuborough, Sutcombe; Soldon, Holsworthy; Netherton, Farway; Ashburton; Nutwell, Woodbury; Ford Abbey, Thorncombe all in Devon, and at Prideaux Place, Padstow and Prideaux manor, Luxulyan, in Cornwall. Fox (1874) stated in regard of the Kingsbridge branch of Prideaux: "We have no intention ... of tracing the pedigree back to old Paganus de Prideaux, who came over from Normandy with William the Conqueror, and who was Lord of the Castle of Prideaux, in Cornwall".

In fiction

Jim Prideaux, a mid-level British intelligence agent in John le Carré's Tinker Tailor Soldier Spy (1974)

See also

Hingston & Prideaux

Footnotes

Cornish-language surnames